Victor Sillon (24 December 1927 – 14 December 2021) was a French athlete who specialised in pole vault. Sillon competed in the Men's pole vault at the 1948 Summer Olympics, 1956 Summer Olympics, and 1960 Summer Olympics. He was born in Lamentin, Martinique, France. He died on 16 December 2021, at the age of 93.

References

External links
 

1927 births
2021 deaths
French male pole vaulters
Olympic athletes of France
French people of Martiniquais descent
Athletes (track and field) at the 1948 Summer Olympics
Athletes (track and field) at the 1956 Summer Olympics
Athletes (track and field) at the 1960 Summer Olympics
Mediterranean Games gold medalists for France
Mediterranean Games medalists in athletics
Athletes (track and field) at the 1951 Mediterranean Games